Mullah Mohammad Nasim Akhundzada (died 1990) was a mujahideen commander and Pashtun warlord who operated in Helmand Province, Afghanistan during the 1980s.  Based out of Musa Qala in northern Helmand, Nasim was from the Alizai tribe. He issued a fatwa legalizing poppy cultivation in 1981.  During the 1980s he gradually consolidated power over most of Helmand, eliminating other mujahideen factions.  He was assassinated in March 1990 in Pakistan.  His nephew Sher Mohammad Akhundzada was the governor of Helmand until 2005 and is an important Afghan politician.

References

Mujahideen members of the Soviet–Afghan War
Pashtun people
1990 deaths
Afghan Sunni Muslims
Year of birth missing